In most instances, school bus manufacturers are second stage manufacturers; however, a few school buses (typically those of Type D configuration) utilize a body and chassis produced by a single manufacturer.

School bus configurations
The North American school bus industry produces buses in four different body configurations, listed below:

Lists of manufacturers

See also
List of buses

References

 
Bus-related lists
Lists of manufacturers
Secondary education-related lists